Rendo is a surname. Notable persons with that name include:

Alberto Rendo (born 1940), Argentine footballer
Carlos Rendo (born 1964), American attorney and politician
Eric Rendo, a player on the 2016 Uruguay national rugby league team
Fabián Rendo, an actor in the film Cacería and the telenovela Malparida
Mario Rendo, Sicilian entrepreneur associated with Benedetto Santapaola

See also 
 Rendon (disambiguation)